Saru Maini (born 27 April 1988) is an Indian playback singer. Saru made her debut in the playback genre with the song "Bhangara Paale" in a duet with Sonu Nigam, for the movie Anthony Kaun Hai? in 2006.

Early life and career
Saru hails from Bangalore. At an early she her music video of her song entitled "Dil De Diya Tha" (Sutta Mix) became popular. Actress Meghna Naidu was featured in the song. She has performed musical themes for the movie Mumbai Mast Kallander.

Discography

film songs

References

External links

 

1988 births
Living people
Bollywood playback singers
Indian women playback singers
21st-century Indian women singers
21st-century Indian singers
Hindi-language singers
Bengali-language singers
21st-century Indian scholars